Al-Mirhadh is a sub-district located in Na'man District, Al Bayda Governorate, Yemen.  Al-Mirhadh had a population of 987  according to the 2004 census.

References 

Sub-districts in Na'man District